Hackney Downs is a park and an area of historically common land in the Lower Clapton area of the London Borough of Hackney. The name is sometimes also used to apply to the neighbourhood around the park.

Hackney Downs Park
The Downs open space was originally common land, preserved from the 1860s as parkland as a result of pressure by the Commons Preservation Society. At , the park is one of the larger open spaces wholly within the London Borough of Hackney. It has a play area, basketball courts, football pitches and a bowling green.

Occupying, as it does, a fairly central place in Hackney, the park used to be the yearly venue for the popular Hackney Show, but this event — which helped to give a sense of community and identity to an often-troubled borough — has been discontinued in recent times as a cost-cutting measure, as have the regular Fireworks Night shows. The park was given a Green Flag award in July 2008.

Neighbourhood

The ‘Hackney Downs’ neighbourhood can be described as the western part of Lower Clapton; the area to the west of Cricketfield Road and east of the railway line. The streets north and south of the park are dominated by social housing (such as the Nightingale Estate) – these areas were largely rebuilt during the 1930s and 1960s.

Education

Hackney Downs School was also located here. The site has been redeveloped as the Mossbourne Community Academy.

Governance
Hackney Downs is currently a ward name, the represented area of three councillors, of Hackney Council up for election every 4 years.

Transport and locale

The two London Overground stations are Hackney Central on the North London line and Hackney Downs on the Lea Valley Lines to Liverpool Street.

References

External links
 Mossbourne Community Academy 
 Blasts From The Past (LBH film of demolition of the tower blocks on the north side of the Downs).

Districts of the London Borough of Hackney
Areas of London
Parks and open spaces in the London Borough of Hackney
Common land in London
Clapton, London